Antarctic Polar Front may refer to:

The Antarctic Convergence, in oceanography
The Polar Front commonly known as the "Antarctic Front", in atmospheric science and meteorology